Hsu Kuo-jung (born 23 January 1970) is a Taiwanese bobsledder. He competed in the four man event at the 1992 Winter Olympics.

References

1970 births
Living people
Taiwanese male bobsledders
Olympic bobsledders of Taiwan
Bobsledders at the 1992 Winter Olympics
Place of birth missing (living people)
20th-century Taiwanese people